Laura Arraya (born 12 January 1964) is a retired Peruvian tennis player. She was also known by her married name Laura Gildemeister.

Career
At a young age, Argentine-born Arraya emigrated to Peru with her family and acquired Peruvian nationality. She later represented Peru in international matches. Her best result in a Grand Slam was a quarterfinal at Wimbledon in 1991. Her brother Pablo Arraya is =a former tennis player, who reached the top 30 in the Association of Tennis Professionals rankings. In 1984, Arraya married Chilean tennis player Heinz Gildemeister, but they later divorced.

At present, she directs a tennis academy in Lima and in Key Biscayne with her brother Pablo.

When she won the OTB Open in July 1989, she became the first mother since Evonne Goolagong to win a Women's Tennis Association tournament.

WTA Tour finals

Singles: 10 (4–6)

Doubles: 10 (1–9)

Grand Slam singles performance timeline

Other finals

Singles (3-1)

Doubles (2–2)

References

External links
 
 
 

1964 births
Living people
Peruvian female tennis players
21st-century Peruvian women
20th-century Peruvian women